Kihachi (written: 喜八) is a masculine Japanese given name. Notable people with the name include:

, Japanese film director
, Japanese poet

Japanese masculine given names